Krzysztof Płatek (born 13 January 1962 in Strzelin) is a Polish former athlete who specialised in the sprint hurdles. He represented his country at the 1987 World Championships reaching the semifinals. He is also a two-time outdoor and one-time indoor national champion.

His personal bests are 13.61 seconds in the 110 metres hurdles (+1.7 m/s; Warsaw 1988) and 7.78 seconds in the 60 metres hurdles (Zabrze 1987).

International competitions

References

1962 births
Living people
Polish male hurdlers
World Athletics Championships athletes for Poland
People from Strzelin
20th-century Polish people